Phaidra Knight (born July 4, 1974) is an American former rugby union footballer who was a member of the United States national team from 1999 to 2017. She participated in the 2002, 2006, and 2010 Women's Rugby World Cup, and won All-World Team honors in the first two World Cups.

She was named USA Rugby's Player of the Decade in 2010. On October 26, 2017, World Rugby announced that she would be inducted into the World Rugby Hall of Fame on November 10 of that year, with the ceremony held at the Hall's facility in Rugby, England. Knight is an open lesbian sportswomen.

Early life 
Knight was born on July 4, 1974. She grew up on her family's farm near the small town of Irwinton, Georgia. At the age of four Knight began helping out on the farm in the summer, picking vegetables and hoisting pigs into the trucks. Working on the farm did not get in the way for young Knight to play sports. Knight began playing basketball at the young age of four. She was able to use a portion of her family's field as a basketball court, with her uncle (a basketball player) installing a basketball hoop for her.

Although she was already playing basketball Knight had always wanted to play on the midget league football team, but girls were not allowed to play. In her efforts to be as close to the game of football as she could, she joined the midget league cheer leading squad instead.

Knight began playing organized sports in middle school, joining the basketball team. She would continue on to play Varsity Basketball in High School along with Varsity Tennis.

Rugby 
After graduating from Wilkinson County High School, Knight went to college at Alabama State University. Knight put aside sports in college to focus on her academics and dream of going to law school. She would go on to attend the University of Wisconsin Law School. Knight entered law school with the intention of getting back into competitive sports, with the intention of trying out for their basketball team.

"I met a young lady at a party and she invited me to try out for rugby," Knight recalled. "I'd never heard of rugby. She characterized it as being like football and soccer. Then she said 'tackle' and I was like 'I'm there.' I went to a practice the next week, and that was it."

Knight graduated from Wisconsin Law in 1999, making her first U.S. Rugby Team that same year. She played with the USA Rugby team for 12 years, from 1999 to 2013. Recognized as one of the best players in the world in two different positions (prop and flanker). Knight has made three world cup appearances with the USA Women's Rugby team in 2002, 2006 and 2010.

Honors and recognition 

 2003, the only American named to the 2003 World XV team 
 2002, World Cup All-World Team honors
 2006, World Cup All-World Team honors
 2010, named USA Rugby Player of the Decade
 2010, Travel & Training Fund Grant recipient from The Women's Sports Foundation
 2010, appeared on MTV's Made as a rugby coach
 2017, Inducted into World Rugby Hall of Fame

Bobsled 
In 2013, Knight pursued a new goal. She was vying for a spot on the U.S. Bobsled team, with dreams of competing in the 2014 Winter Olympics in Sochi. Although she trained immensely, including time at the Lake Placid training center, she did not make the team.

Coaching career 
In 2016, Knight began coaching women's rugby. She joined the staff of Princeton University's Women's Rugby Football Clubs as Forwards Coach for the Fall 2016 season. Launching in the Fall of 2017, Knight was appointed Coach of the Women's Rugby Program at Monroe College, a new program that Knight will be spearheading.

References

External links
 USA Rugby profile
 World Rugby Hall of Fame profile

United States women's international rugby union players
Living people
1974 births
People from Wilkinson County, Georgia
University of Wisconsin Law School alumni
Sportspeople from Georgia (U.S. state)
American rugby union coaches
American female rugby union players
World Rugby Hall of Fame inductees
Lesbian sportswomen
American LGBT sportspeople
LGBT rugby union players
LGBT people from Georgia (U.S. state)
LGBT African Americans
21st-century American women